The Heath 1100 Stakes, is a registered Melbourne Racing Club Group 3 Thoroughbred open horse race held under set weight conditions with penalties, for horses aged four years old and older, over a distance of 1100 metres, held at Caulfield Racecourse, Melbourne, Australia. Total prize money is A$200,000.

History

The Heath is the local historical name for Caulfield Racecourse.

Name
 prior 2001 - Thomas North Handicap
 2002 - GB Galvanising Sprint
 2003 - Australian Racing Museum Plate
 2004–2005 - Jayco Plate
 2006 - The Heath 1100
 2007 - Martha Cove Classic
 2008–2010 - Clams Seafood Stakes
 2011 - Slickpix Stakes
 2012–2015 - theshark.com.au Stakes
 2016 - The Resimax Stakes

Distance
 2002 onwards - 1100 metres

Grade
 prior 2004 - Handicap (unlisted)
 2005–2012 - Listed race
 2013 onwards - Group 3

Venue
 2002 onwards - Caulfield Racecourse

Winners

 2022 - Shooting For Gold 
 2021 - Masked Crusader 
 2020 - Diamond Effort
 2019 - Crystal Dreamer
 2018 - Ball Of Muscle
 2017 - Voodoo Lad
 2016 - Redzel
 2015 - Bounding
2014 - Flamberge
2013 - Samaready
2012 - Golden Archer 
2011 - Atomic Force  
2010 - Rightfully Yours             
2009 - First Command                      
2008 - Bel Mer                         
2007 - Undue                         
2006 - Shadoways                         
2005 - Classiconi  
2004 - Monahan Tweed    
2003 - Lovely Jubly      
2002 - Crystal Finale

See also
 List of Australian Group races
 Group races

References

Horse races in Australia
Recurring sporting events established in 2005